The Black Network is an American short musical film released in 1936 that was directed by Roy Mack and released through Vitaphone. It is extant.

Synopsis 
Nina Mae McKinney plays the star performer of a radio show who must contend with the wife of a sponsor who wants to take over her spot. The wife, Mezzanine, is more than willing to use her husband's shoe polish company to blackmail the show to do as she wishes. Ultimately Mezzanine's singing is so terrible that listeners complain and she is taken off the show, the status quo restored.

Cast
 Nina Mae McKinney 
 The Nicholas Brothers
 The Washboard Serenaders
 Babe Wallace
 Amanda Randolph as Mezzanine Johnson

Production 
The Black Network went into production at the Brooklyn Vitaphone studios during December 1935, starting on December 7. Nina Mae McKinney and The Nicholas Brothers were announced as the film's stars; they had previously worked together in the 1932 Roy Mack film Pie Pie Blackbird. The film, which was created as part of the "Broadway Brevity" series, adapted a script written by A. Dorian Otvos and special songs were credited to Cliff Hess. Photography was by Ray Foster and the film was edited by Bert Frank.

Release 
The Black Network was released to theaters in 1936, where it was shown as a supplemental film alongside movies such as The Lion's Den and Adventure in Manhattan.

Reception 
The Film Daily praised The Black Network, citing the actors' performances as a highlight while noting that the story was not original.

See also
Vitaphone Varieties

References

External links
 
 The Black Network at the TCM Movie Database

1936 musical comedy films
1936 short films
American short films
African-American films